Party Pier station, is a station of Haizhu Tram of the Guangzhou Metro. It started operations on 21 October 2015.

References

Railway stations in China opened in 2015
Guangzhou Metro stations in Haizhu District